The Michigan Area Conference is one of 54 Annual Conferences of The United Methodist Church in the United States. They are one of 10 members of the North Central Jurisdiction. The Michigan Area Annual Conference represents more than 830 local United Methodist churches with approximately 130,000 members in total. The Michigan Area Conference Center is located in Lansing.

Mission 
The mission of the conference is to, "Make Disciples of Jesus Christ for the Transformation of the world."

Districts 

The Michigan Area Annual Conference is organized into Nine districts: Central Bay, East Winds, Greater Detroit, Greater Southwest, Heritage, Mid-Michigan, Midwest, Northern Waters And Northern Skies.

Michigan Area 
The conference is led by Bishop David A. Bard, who was appointed in 2016.

On June 10, 2015 it was announced that the voting members at the 2015 West Michigan Annual Conference had voted in favor of joining with the Detroit Annual Conference to create a "New Michigan Area Conference." Pastor Glenn M. Wagner of Grand Haven and Rev. Marsha Woolley of Northville were selected as co-chairs of the new conference. The final vote tally follows: 551 yes and 83 no. As stated in the approved legislative materials, the new conference shall be established no later than January 1, 2019.

Michigan's General Conference Delegates are Anne Soles, John Wharton

Major Cities

Major Cities in the conference include: Detroit, Traverse City, Grand Rapids, Kalamazoo, Sault. Ste. Marie, Bay City, Lansing, and Mackinaw City.

Colleges/Universities affiliated with UMC 
Adrian College

Albion College

References

External links
Official website
District list
Bishop Kiessey profile

United Methodist Annual Conferences